Grace Abbey (born 21 January 1999) is an English-born Australian footballer who currently plays for Adelaide United and the Australia women's national under-20 soccer team.

References

External links
 Aussie Footballers Abbas to Alberton

1999 births
Adelaide United FC (A-League Women) players
Australian women's soccer players
English expatriate sportspeople in Australia
English expatriate women's footballers
Expatriate women's soccer players in Australia
Footballers from Oxford
Living people
Women's association football defenders